The 1991–92 I-Divisioona season was the 18th season of the I-Divisioona, the second level of Finnish ice hockey. 12 teams participated in the league, and Kiekko Espoo won the championship and was promoted to the SM-liiga as a result.

Regular season

External links 
 Season on hockeydb.com

2
Fin
I-Divisioona seasons